Guest of honour (or honor) may refer to:

Film, television and theatre
 Guest of Honour (1934 film), a British comedy film directed by George King
 Guest of Honour (2019 film), a Canadian drama film by Atom Egoyan
 A Guest of Honor (opera), a 1903 opera by Scott Joplin
 "Guest of Honour" (Upstairs, Downstairs), a television episode

Literature
 A Guest of Honour (novel), a 1970 novel Nadine Gordimer
 Guest of Honor, a 1993 comic book penciled by Michael Zulli
 "Guest of Honor", a 1993 story by Robert Reed